The trailboards are a pair of boards that may be found at the bow of certain sailing vessels, where they run from the figurehead or billethead back to or towards the hawsepipe. They are in the main decorative, though they often bear the name of the ship; they vary in decoration styles.

References

Shipbuilding
Sailboat components
Sailing ship components
Nautical terminology